James Joseph Melhado (born 29 January 2001) is an English professional footballer who plays as a defender for Salford City.

Career

Early years
Melhado played youth football for Wolverhampton Wanderers for nine years until he was released by the club in late 2016. He then joined the youth set-up at Burton Albion.

Non-league
His senior career featured spells in non-league football with Newcastle Town, and Hanley Town.

Salford City
He turned professional with Salford City in July 2021, signing a two-year contract. He made his debut for the club on 31 August 2021 in the EFL Trophy.

In January 2022 he joined Ashton United on loan. In February 2022 he joined AFC Telford United on loan.

On 25 November 2022 Melhado joined National League North club Hereford on a one-month loan. However the loan ended early in December 2022 after Melhado tore his hamstring.

References

2001 births
Living people
Association football defenders
English footballers
Burton Albion F.C. players
Hanley Town F.C. players
Newcastle Town F.C. players
Salford City F.C. players
Wolverhampton Wanderers F.C. players
Ashton United F.C. players
Northern Premier League players
AFC Telford United players
Hereford F.C. players
National League (English football) players